Rheomorpha is a genus of freshwater annelids belonging to the family Aeolosomatidae. Its only species is Rheomorpha neizvestnovae.

References

Polychaetes
Monotypic annelid genera
Taxa described in 1955